The lesser nighthawk (Chordeiles acutipennis) is a nightjar found throughout a large part of the Americas.

The adults are dark with brown, grey and white patterning on the upperparts and breast; the long upperwings are black and show a white bar in flight. The tail is dark with white barring; the underparts are buffy with fine black horizontal streaking. The adult male has a white throat; the female has a light brown throat.  This bird looks similar to the common nighthawk, but is slightly smaller, has a slightly less deeply forked tail, and is more buffy in coloration.  The calls are also completely different.  The lesser nighthawk has a rapid, low whistled melodious trill, lasting several seconds.  It is usually heard only near breeding areas.

Their breeding habitat is open country from the Southwestern United States through Central America to tropical South America. They usually nest on bare ground, sometimes in raised locations including stumps and boulders or flat house roofs. The two eggs are laid directly on bare ground—there is no nest. Incubation is performed largely by the female and lasts for about 20 days. Young fledge at about 20 days of age.

Adults flushed from the nest may try to distract the intruder or defend the nest site by aerial attack.  Young birds sometimes perform a defense display by opening up their mouths and spreading their wings, looking to appear threatening and larger than they actually are before they run off.

These birds are partial migrants. The lesser nighthawk retreats from the United States and northern Mexico during the winter months.  Occasionally single birds may be found overwintering. The nighthawk is also occasionally found as a vagrant to the US Gulf Coast states to Florida.

They catch flying insects on the wing, mainly foraging near dawn and dusk (crepuscular), sometimes at night with a full moon or near street lighting.

References

External links

Lesser Nighthawk videos on the Internet Bird Collection
Lesser Nighthawk photo gallery VIREO

lesser nighthawk
Native birds of the Southwestern United States
Birds of the Rio Grande valleys
Birds of Central America
Birds of South America
lesser nighthawk